The 2019 Oceania Cup was the inaugural edition of the Oceania Cup. Contested by six teams, the competition began in June and concluded in November.

The competition was announced at the Rugby League International Federation (RLIF) congress in November 2018. The draw was released in March and breaks the six teams into two separate pools with promotion and relegation to exist in what is to become an annual tournament.

The winner of Pool A will win the Oceania Cup while the winner of Pool B will win the Oceania Shield and be promoted to Pool A in the next edition in place of Australia, who were due to travel to Europe for their first Kangaroos tour since 2003.

Venues
The games were played at the following venues in New Zealand and Australia.

Results

Group A - Cup

Notes:
 Jahrome Hughes, Briton Nikora (both New Zealand), Manase Fainu, Kotoni Staggs, and Sitili Tupouniua (all Tonga) made their Test debuts, while John Asiata made his debut for Tonga having previously represented Samoa.

Notes:
 Josh Addo-Carr, Nick Cotric, Payne Haas, Jack Wighton (all Australia), Braden Hamlin-Uele, and Corey Harawira-Naera (both New Zealand) made their Test debuts, while Paul Vaughan made his debut for Australia having previously represented Italy, and Charnze Nicoll-Klokstad and Zane Tetevano made their debut for New Zealand both having previously represented the Cook Islands.

Notes:
 Cameron Murray (Australia) made his Test debut.
Though with an invitational side, this is Tonga's first win over Australia.

Group B - Shield

Notes:
 Xavier Coates, Edene Gebbie, Edwin Ipape, Zev John, Kyle Laybutt, Bernard Lewis, Terry Wapi (all Papua New Guinea), Chanel Harris-Tavita, Hymel Hunt, Marion Seve, and Jaydn Su'A (all Samoa) made their Test debuts, while Jamayne Isaako made his debut for Samoa having previously represented New Zealand.

Notes:
 Tino Fa'asuamaleaui, Luciano Leilua, Moses Leota, Ronaldo Mulitalo, Brian To'o (all Samoa), Lamar Liolevave, and Joseph Ratuvakacereivalu (both Fiji) made their Test debuts, while Danny Levi made his debut for Samoa having previously represented New Zealand.

Notes:
 Daniel Russell (Papua New Guinea) made his Test debut, while Alex Johnston made his debut for Papua New Guinea having previously represented Australia.

See also
 International rugby league in 2019

References

Oceania Cup
Oceania Cup
Oceanian rugby league competitions
Oceania Cup
Oceania Cup
Oceania Cup
Oceania Cup